Aristida guayllabambensis is a species of grass found only in Ecuador.

References

guayllabambensis
Flora of Ecuador
Vulnerable plants
Taxonomy articles created by Polbot